Krachi District is a former district that was located in Volta Region (now currently in Oti Region), Ghana. Originally created as an ordinary district assembly on 10 March 1989. However, on 4 August 2004, it was split off into two new districts: Krachi West District (capital: Kete Krachi) and Krachi East District (which it was elevated to municipal district assembly status on 15 March 2018; capital: Dambai). The district assembly was located in the northern part of Volta Region and had Kete Krachi as its capital town.

References

2003 disestablishments in Ghana
Former districts of Ghana
States and territories disestablished in 2003